Čagona is a settlement in the Municipality of Cerkvenjak in northeastern Slovenia. It lies on the edge of the Slovene Hills and partly in the Pesnica Valley. The area is part of the traditional region of Styria and is now included in the Drava Statistical Region.

References

External links

Čagona on Geopedia

Populated places in the Municipality of Cerkvenjak